Pauri Bareli is a Bhil language of India. It is close to two other languages called Bareli, Rathwi (not Rathwi Bhilali) and Palya, as well as to Kalto, but is not mutually intelligible with them.

References

Languages of India
Bhil